Elachista unifasciella is a moth of the family Elachistidae found in Asia and Europe.

Description
Adults are on wing from June to July in one generation per year.

The larvae feed on Avenula pubescens, false-brome (Brachypodium sylvaticum), cock's-foot (Dactylis glomerata), creeping soft grass (Holcus mollis) and wood millet (Milium effusum). They mine the leaves of their host plant. First, they create a long, somewhat blistered, slightly transparent corridor. Later, they mine the basal leaves lying on the ground. Larvae are light yellow with a light brown head and can be found from autumn to the end of May.

Distribution
It is found from Sweden to the Pyrenees, Italy and Greece and from Great Britain to Russia and Turkey.

References

unifasciella
Leaf miners
Moths of Asia
Moths described in 1828
Moths of Europe
Taxa named by Adrian Hardy Haworth